The 2000 Challenge Tour was the 12th season of the Challenge Tour, the official development tour to the European Tour. The tour started as the Satellite Tour with its first Order of Merit rankings in 1989 and was officially renamed as the Challenge Tour at the start of the 1990 season.

The Challenge Tour Rankings were won by Sweden's Henrik Stenson.

Schedule
The following table lists official events during the 2000 season.

Unofficial events
The following events were sanctioned by the Challenge Tour, but did not carry official money, wins were still official however.

Challenge Tour Rankings
For full rankings, see 2000 Challenge Tour graduates.

The rankings were based on prize money won during the season, calculated in Euros. The top 15 players on the tour earned status to play on the 2001 European Tour.

See also
2000 European Tour

Notes

References

External links
Official homepage of the Challenge Tour

Challenge Tour seasons
Challenge Tour